Abdullah Eida al-Ruzami was the military leader of Zaidi rebels, known as the Houthis, who fought against the government of Yemen during the Houthi insurgency in Yemen.

He co-signed a letter to the Yemeni government with Yahia Badreddin al-Houthi, the rebels' spiritual leader, in May 2005 offering an end to the uprising if the government would send emissaries or ended the military campaign against the rebels. "But if injustice continues with killing, destroying, and imprisonment... then the trouble will not be solved, but will become more complicated and the gap will become even wider."

Al-Ruzami has twice turned himself into government authorities, but has never been arrested or imprisoned. Ten days after the alleged death of al-Houthi in September 2004, and again on 23 June 2005, al-Ruzami turned himself into police in Sana'a after negotiations between tribal authorities.

References 

Living people
Year of birth missing (living people)
Yemeni Zaydis
Houthi members